The M class were the standard minesweeper  of Nazi Germany's Kriegsmarine during World War II.  The vessels were the primary force in Germany's harbor defense command and were organized administratively into minesweeper flotillas.

History

M1915 and M1916
A total of 36 old units from World War I served in World War II. Some of these were converted to experimental ships, artillery school ships, fleet tenders or R-boat tenders, and 1 (ex-M109) was converted into a survey ship. In 1940, most of these converted vessels were re-designated as minesweepers again.

M1935

The first series; the M1935 were ordered in the late 1930s to replace worn out World War I vintage boats. These ships proved versatile and seaworthy. The vessels could also undertake convoy escort, anti-submarine warfare and minelaying tasks as well as minesweeping. However, the ships  were very expensive and complicated to build, and their oil-fired boilers meant they suffered from the fuel shortages in the later years of the war. A total of 69 ships were built in eight different shipyards, between 1937 and 1941. 34 were lost during the war.

M1940
Although the M1935 was a very satisfactory vessel, it was complex and expensive to build and a simplified design was put into production in 1941. These ships had coal-fired boilers because of oil shortages. A total of 127 ships were built between 1941 and 1944, and 63 M1940 class ships were sunk during the war.

The M1940 ships had a standard displacement of 543 tons and a full load displacement of 775 tons. They measured 62.3 meters in length, with a beam of 8.5 meters and a draught of 2.3 meters. Armament consisted of one 105 mm guns plus one 37 mm and six to eight 20 mm anti-aircraft guns. They were powered by two coal-fired boilers driving a two-shaft triple-expansion engine, which generated an output of 2,400 hp resulting in a top speed of 17 knots and a range 1,043 nautical miles at that speed.

Four vessels of this type were launched for the Romanian Navy in 1943 as the Democrația class. They were built locally from German materials. These were structurally identical with the German boats but with a different armament.

M1943
This was a further simplified and slightly enlarged version of the M1940. These ships were designed for pre-fabrication and were produced in four versions:
 Minesweeper
 Anti-submarine vessel with extra depth charges
 Torpedo boat, with two  torpedo tubes
 Torpedo training vessel
Only 18 vessels were completed by the time the war ended.

Post-war

After the end of the war the surviving ships were allocated to the United States, Britain and the Soviet Union.
Many were assigned to the German Mine Sweeping Administration under British control to clear the coast of Northern Europe of mines. Several were later also given to France and Norway, and two to Italy.

Eleven of the ships were returned to Germany in 1956/57 and were recommissioned into the Bundesmarine.

Fourteen M1940-type minesweepers (known as the Guadiaro class) were built for the Spanish Navy in Spanish shipyards. Seven of them were modernised with some help from the US Navy and served in the Spanish Navy for more than thirty years.

See also 
 R boat, for smaller German minesweepers
 Sperrbrecher for another type of German World War 2 minesweeper

References
Notes

Bibliography

 Conway's All The World's Fighting Ships 1922–1946

Online sources
 Mine hunter M1935, at German Navy website
 Mine hunter M1940, at German Navy website
 Mine hunter M1943, at German Navy website

Further reading 
 

World War II minesweepers of Germany
Mine warfare vessel classes
Ships built in Germany
Minesweepers of the Romanian Naval Forces
Ships built in Romania